Sulamita Aronovsky ( Ziuraitiene; 5 May 1929 – 15 December 2022) was a Soviet-born British classical pianist and piano teacher who spent her formative years in Russia, moving to London in 1971.

Aronovsky was born in Kaunas, Soviet Union (now part of Lithuania) on 5 May 1929. Her teachers included Lev Barenboim, Abram Schatzkes, Grigory Ginsburg and Alexander Goldenweiser.
An experienced Juror of International Competitions, she founded the London International Piano Competition in 1991.

In 1971, after visiting family in the USA, she decided to defect to Britain, where she settled in Manchester, teaching at the Royal Northern College of Music.

In the 1990s, Aronovsky moved to London, where she served as Professor of Piano at the Royal Academy of Music.

Aronovsky's students included Peter Lawson, David Fanning, Julia Goldstein, Vovka Ashkenazy, Melani Mestre, Michael Bell, John Thwaites, Pamela Chowhan, Ian Flint, Amir Katz, Andrew Wilde, Ian Fountain, Stefan Ćirić, Junko Urayama, Nils Franke, Howard Evans, Gareth Jones, Nicolas Hodges, Beate Perrey, Jonathan Powell, Nicholas Angelich, Raul Jimenez, Toby Purser, Nicolette Wong, Panos Karan and Riyad Nicolas among others.

Aronovsky died on 15 December 2022, at the age of 93.

References

External links 
 
 London International Piano Competition

1929 births
2022 deaths
21st-century classical pianists
21st-century women pianists
Russian classical pianists
Russian women pianists
Lithuanian classical pianists
Lithuanian women pianists
Women classical pianists
Academics of the Royal Academy of Music
Lithuanian Jews
Jewish classical pianists
Women music educators
Musicians from Kaunas
Academics of the Royal Northern College of Music